Bertram Cohen (25 September 1892 – 30 June 1955) was an Australian cricketer. He played four first-class cricket matches for Victoria between 1914 and 1934. At club level he played for St Kilda.

See also
 List of Victoria first-class cricketers

References

External links
 

1892 births
1955 deaths
Australian cricketers
Victoria cricketers
Cricketers from Greater London
English emigrants to Australia